Hashim Akhtar Naqvi is an Indian calligrapher. He was born on 13 February 1948, in Lucknow and received a diploma from Lucknow University.

Achievements in calligraphy

World record
He was inspired by the calligraphy of his father, Hasan Akhtar, who died when Hashim was barely two years old. He copied his father's designs and later he made his own during his school days. He took up designing calligraphy for the holy phrase "Bismillah..." at the behest of Janab Maulana Kalbe Abid, Mujtahid. Initially (in 1989) he created 789 designs, which had increased to 6000 designs in 1991. This feat is included under "Endeavour" in the Limca Book of Records from 1991, 1992, 1993 and so on.

Awards & other honors
First prize for "Innovative Calligraphy" at the All India competition of Calligraphy organized by the Jammu and Kashmir Academy of Art, Culture and Languages, Srinagar in 1989.
Tauheed-ul-Muslimeen Trust certificate of merit 1991–1992.
Out of a total 113 Bismillah...designs the Dar-ul-Quran publishers, Mumbai used 52 "Bismillah..." designs for their Quran.

Exhibitions
 Lucknow, 1986,1987,1989,2004
 New Delhi, 1990, 2008
 Mumbai, 1991
 Allahbad, 1992

References

Sources
 Financial Express: "First verse of the Koran in 6,000 different styles
 The Hindu Business Line: Master calligrapher Hashim Akhtar Naqvi has inscribed his name in fame with several path-breaking designs..
 Abu Usamah's weblog
 Scribd: Crafts of India
 Scribd: Calligraphy

Indian calligraphers
Living people
1948 births
Indian male artists